James Osmyn Berry (January 16, 1932 – March 20, 2015) was an American comic strip artist.

Berry was born in Chicago in 1932 and attended Dartmouth College and Ohio Wesleyan University.

In 1961, Berry began working for the Newspaper Enterprise Association.

His most notable work may well be the syndicated editorial cartoon Berry's World, distributed six days a week for more than 40 years beginning in 1963. There was also a Sunday comic strip version of the strip, about which he stated "I enjoy working in color on the Sunday pages and having all that space in which to draw".

The National Headliner Award was presented to Berry in 1967. Berry won the National Cartoonists Society award for Best Special Feature in 1970 and 1972. He also produced the comic strip Benjy in 1974 and 1975.

He wrote with Denny O'Neil the novel Dragon's Fist. O'Neil adapt later this story in Richard Dragon, Kung Fu Fighter

He retired on January 1, 2003 and died on March 20, 2015.

References

Further reading
Strickler, Dave. Syndicated Comic Strips and Artists, 1924-1995: The Complete Index.'' Cambria, CA: Comics Access, 1995. .

External links
 
Michigan State University Libraries: Index to Comic Art Collection
Syracuse University Special Collections Research Center: An inventory of his cartoons

Billy Ireland Cartoon Library & Museum Art Database

1932 births
2015 deaths
American comic strip cartoonists
American comics artists
Ohio Wesleyan University alumni
Artists from Chicago